José Miguel Cantillana Galea (1 October 1966) is a Chilean former footballer and coach.

Career

Cantillana managed Chilean clubs Unión Temuco and Deportes Iquique before being appointed manager of O'Higgins F.C. in September 2011. He had a very successful spell with Iquique, winning the 2010 Copa Chile Bicentenario and 2010 Chilean Primera División B.

Honours

Assistant coach
Santiago Wanderers
 Primera División (1): 2001

Coach
Deportes Iquique
 Primera B (1): 2010
 Copa Chile (1): 2010

References

External links
 José Cantillana at PartidosdeLaRoja.com  
 José Cantillana at SoloFutbol.cl 

1966 births
Living people
People from Iquique
Chilean footballers
Chile international footballers
Cobresal footballers
Deportes Iquique footballers
Chilean Primera División players
Primera B de Chile players
Association football defenders
Chilean football managers
Chilean expatriate football managers
Cobresal managers
Deportes Iquique managers
O'Higgins F.C. managers
Deportes Antofagasta managers
Primera B de Chile managers
Chilean Primera División managers
Chilean expatriate sportspeople in Mexico
Expatriate football managers in Mexico